Surily Goel is an Indian fashion designer. 

Goel studied at the Fashion Institute of Design and Merchandising in Los Angeles. This was followed by her own range of clothing titled "Surily". She broke into the Bollywood film industry when she styled for Preity Zinta in the film Salaam Namaste (2005), produced by Yash Raj Films.

Goel made her debut during Lakme Fashion Week in 2006. Her collection was titled Roses Forever. She had Salman Khan, Malaika Arora Khan, and former actress Neelam to model her collection.

Goel has been trained by fellow designer Manish Malhotra.

She did the styling for Preity Zinta once again in Jaan-E-Mann (2006) and worked with acclaimed director Sanjay Leela Bhansali for his film Saawariya (2007).

Filmography
 Salaam Namaste (2005)
 Jaan-E-Mann (2006)
 Ta Ra Rum Pum (2007)
 The Last Lear (2007)
 Saawariya (2007)
 Blue (2009)

References

External links

 
 

Year of birth missing (living people)
Living people
Indian women fashion designers